19th Avenue may refer to:
 19th Avenue (San Francisco)
 19th Avenue (Brooklyn)